Midlothian North and Musselburgh is a constituency of the Scottish Parliament (Holyrood) covering parts of the council areas of Midlothian and East Lothian. It elects one Member of the Scottish Parliament (MSP) by the plurality (first past the post) method of election. It is one of nine constituencies in the Lothian electoral region, which elects seven additional members, in addition to the nine constituency MSPs, to produce a form of proportional representation for the region as a whole.

The seat was created for the 2011 Scottish Parliament election, and covers areas that were formerly part of the constituencies of Midlothian and Edinburgh East and Musselburgh, both of which were abolished. It has been held by Colin Beattie of the Scottish National Party since creation.

Electoral region 

The other eight constituencies of the Lothian region are Almond Valley, Edinburgh Central, Edinburgh Eastern, Edinburgh Northern and Leith, Edinburgh Pentlands, Edinburgh Southern, Edinburgh Western and Linlithgow.

The region includes all of the City of Edinburgh council area, parts of the East Lothian council area, parts of the Midlothian council area and all of the West Lothian council area.

Constituency boundaries and council area 

Midlothian is represented by two constituencies in the Scottish Parliament, these are Midlothian North and Musselburgh and Midlothian South, Tweeddale and Lauderdale, the latter is part of the South Scotland region. Part of the constituency is within the East Lothian council area, the remainder of which is represented by the East Lothian constituency (also within the South Scotland region).

From the 2011 Scottish Parliament election, the newly formed constituency of Midlothian North and Musselburgh is formed from the following electoral wards:

In full: Bonnyrigg, Dalkeith, Midlothian East, (all from Midlothian council area), Musselburgh (from East Lothian council area)
In part: Midlothian West (from Midlothian council area, shared with Midlothian South, Tweeddale and Lauderdale constituency), Tranent/Wallyford/Macmerry (from East Lothian council area, shared with East Lothian constituency)

Member of the Scottish Parliament

Election results

2020s

2010s

Footnotes

External links

Scottish Parliament constituencies and regions from 2011
Politics of Midlothian
Politics of East Lothian
Musselburgh
Constituencies of the Scottish Parliament
Constituencies established in 2011
2011 establishments in Scotland
Dalkeith
Bonnyrigg and Lasswade
Wallyford